Downey is a city located in Southeast Los Angeles County, California, United States,  southeast of Downtown Los Angeles. It is considered part of the Gateway Cities. The city is the birthplace of the Apollo space program. It is also the home of the oldest operating McDonald's restaurant in the world. As of the 2020 census, the city had a total population of 114,355.

History

18th century to World War II

Mission San Gabriel Arcángel was initially founded on September 8, 1771, near settlements of the Tongva people. It was located in the Whittier Narrows on a bluff overlooking the Rio Hondo, near the intersection of today's San Gabriel Blvd and Lincoln Avenue.  After five years, flooding forced the relocation of the mission to its present site in San Gabriel.

In 1784, Governor Pedro Fages granted to former soldier Manuel Nieto (1734–1804) the largest of the land concessions made in what was then Alta California, a province of New Spain.  Its  stretched from the Santa Ana River on the east to the Old San Gabriel River (now the Rio Hondo and Los Angeles River) on the west, and from the mission highway (approximately Whittier Boulevard) on the north to the ocean on the south.  Its acreage was slightly reduced later at the insistence of Mission San Gabriel on whose lands it infringed. The Spanish concessions, of which 25 were made in California, were unlike the later Mexican land grants in that title was not transferred but were similar to grazing permits with the title remaining with the Spanish crown.

The Rancho Los Nietos passed to Manuel Nieto's four children upon his death and remained intact until 1833 when his heirs petitioned Mexican Governor José Figueroa to partition the property. The northwestern portion of the original rancho, comprising the Downey-Norwalk area, was granted as Rancho Santa Gertrudes to Josefa Cota, the widow of Manuel's son, Antonio Nieto. After the Mexican–American War concluded in 1848, many of the Californio ranchos were obtained by affluent Anglo-Americans who were immigrating west under the United States manifest destiny doctrine, and marrying into established Californio Spanish families. This migration was distinct from that prompted by the California Gold Rush farther north.

Dairy was a major industry in Downey. The Central Milk Agency marketed the milk for "seven hundred dairymen whose dairy herds range from thirty to two thousand head" with the value of the products marketed in excess of $1,000,000 per month. 
 
Some of Downey's settlers came from Ireland. Downey was founded by and named for the former and youngest ever governor of California, John Gately Downey, who was born in Ireland.  Although he was an Irish Democrat, he supported the Republican Lincoln in his efforts to keep the Union intact during the American Civil War. He pioneered the modern subdivision with land he acquired between the Rio Hondo and the San Gabriel River, in about 1865.  Downey was convinced that oranges would flourish in Southern California, so he imported several varieties, and therefore set in motion what became one of the state's biggest cash crops.  In conjunction with the construction of the Tehachapi Loop, the Southern Pacific Railroad arrived in 1873.

Gallatin
Two small settlements were established along the Rio Hondo River - College Settlement and Gallatin, the latter near where today, Paramount Boulevard and Florence Avenue cross. In the late 1860s the Gallatin residents built a small school known as the "Little Red Gallatin School House". By 1871, it wasn't large enough and a two-story school was built.  Gallatin School moved in 1893 to its present site.  Later, Alameda School and Downey School were built. By 1883, College Settlement, Gallatin, and Downey joined together, and with the help of Governor Downey convinced the Southern Pacific Railroad to route through and stop in Downey. The new center of activity migrated to the depot area, and this became the center of a new larger Downey, uniting the three previous settlements.

After World War II

Farmers in the area grew grain, corn, castor beans, and fruit, and by 1935 Downey was characterized as an "orange-grove town". 
Downey was incorporated in 1956 and instituted a charter form of government in 1964.  Suburban homes and factories replaced the farms after World War II.

Aerospace
Vultee Aircraft was Downey's largest employer during World War II producing 15% of all of America's military aircraft by 1941. The company was a pioneer in the use of women in manufacturing positions and was the first aircraft company to build airplanes on a powered assembly line. Vultee became a part of North American Aviation (later North American Rockwell, then Rockwell International which was then bought by the Boeing company) whose facilities were the birthplace of the systems for the Apollo Space Program as well as the Space Shuttle. For over 70 years, Downey's Rockwell NASA plant produced and tested many of the 20th century's greatest aviation, missile, and space endeavors.

But, by the post-Cold War 1990s, Downey was severely hit by cutbacks in the defense budget. Rockwell International which once had more than 30,000 employees had fewer than 5,000 in 1992. The seventy-year history of airplane and space vehicle manufacturing in Downey came to an end when the Rockwell plant closed in 1999. The former North American Rockwell plant was demolished, and the site now features the Columbia Memorial Space Center, Downey Landing shopping center, Promenade at Downey shopping center (the former movie studio site of Downey Studios), a Kaiser Permanente hospital, and a city recreation fields park.

Other landmarks
Near the center of the city lies what was in the 1960s one of the busiest intersections in California, the intersection of Lakewood Boulevard (State Route 19) and Firestone Boulevard (former State Route 42).  Route 19 was a major thoroughfare between Pasadena and the port at Long Beach and Route 42 was along part of the old Spanish El Camino Real trail that connected Pueblo de Los Angeles to San Diego.

In the 1960s, the town's Downey Records achieved some notoriety with recordings such as The Chantays' surfing instrumental "Pipeline"; nearly two decades later, Downey local music scene led to the founding of The Blasters and Dark Angel.

Downey is home to Rancho Los Amigos National Rehabilitation Center which is the main public rehabilitation hospital for Los Angeles County. Rancho Los Amigos is renowned worldwide for its innovative contributions to the care of spinal cord injuries and post-polio syndrome.

Downey was featured in the 2008 American action-comedy film Pineapple Express.  Many of the buildings along Florence Avenue are seen in a driving sequence early in the film.

Geography

The cities of South Gate and Bell Gardens are adjacent to the west and northwest, Pico Rivera lies to the northeast, Santa Fe Springs and Norwalk to the east, and Paramount and Bellflower are to the south.

Climate
According to the Köppen Climate Classification system Downey has a semi-arid climate abbreviated "BSk" on climate maps.

Demographics

2010
The 2010 United States Census reported that Downey had a population of 111,772. The racial makeup of Downey was 63,255 (56.6%) White, 19,784 (17.7%) Non-Hispanic White, 7,804 (7.0%) Asian (2.2% Korean, 2.2% Filipino, 0.6% Indian, 0.5% Chinese, 0.3% Vietnamese, 0.3% Japanese, 0.2% Thai, 0.1% Cambodian, 0.1% Pakistani), 4,329 (3.9%) African American, 820 (0.7%) Native American, 221 (0.2%) Pacific Islander, 30,797 (27.6%) from other races, and 4,546 (4.1%) from two or more races. Hispanic or Latino of any race were 78,996 persons (70.7%); 54.0% of Downey residents are of Mexican ancestry, 3.9% Salvadoran, 2.0% Cuban, 2.0% Guatemalan, 1.1% Peruvian, and 1.0% Nicaraguan ancestry.

The Census reported that 111,089 people (99.4% of the population) lived in households, 122 (0.1%) lived in non-institutionalized group quarters, and 561 (0.5%) were institutionalized.

There were 33,936 households, out of which 15,697 (46.3%) had children under the age of 18 living in them, 17,405 (51.3%) were opposite-sex married couples living together, 6,289 (18.5%) had a female householder with no husband present, 2,796 (8.2%) had a male householder with no wife present.  There were 2,357 (6.9%) POSSLQ, and 225 (0.7%) same-sex married couples or partnerships. 5,721 households (16.9%) were made up of individuals, and 2,211 (6.5%) had someone living alone who was 65 years of age or older. The average household size was 3.27.  There were 26,490 families (78.1% of all households); the average family size was 3.68.

The population was spread out, with 29,972 people (26.8%) under the age of 18, 12,108 people (10.8%) aged 18 to 24, 33,056 people (29.6%) aged 25 to 44, 25,057 people (22.4%) aged 45 to 64, and 11,579 people (10.4%) who were 65 years of age or older.  The median age was 33.3 years. For every 100 females, there were 94.1 males.  For every 100 females aged 18 and over, there were 90.4 males.

The homeowner vacancy rate was 1.4%; the rental vacancy rate was 4.9%.  59,555 people (53.3% of the population) lived in owner-occupied housing units and 51,534 people (46.1%) lived in rental housing units. Approximately 30–40 homeless reside in the area.

According to the 2010 United States Census, Downey had a median household income of $60,939, with 11.8% of the population living below the federal poverty line.

2000
As of the 2000 United States Census, there were 107,323 people, 33,989 households, and 26,001 families residing in the city. The population density was 8,641.7 inhabitants per square mile (3,336.4/km2). The racial makeup of the city was 53.48% White, 7.74% Asian, 3.75% Black or African American, 0.87% Native American, 0.22% Pacific Islander, 29.05% from other races, and 4.89% from two or more races.  57.85% of the population were Hispanic or Latino of any race.

There were 33,989 households, out of which 41.8% had children under the age of 18 living with them, 54.1% were married couples living together, 15.8% had a female householder with no husband present, and 23.5% were non-families. 19.1% of all households were made up of individuals, and 8.1% had someone living alone who was 65 years of age or older.  The average household size was 3.11 and the average family size was 3.55.

In the city, the population was spread out, with 29.2% under the age of 18, 9.8% from 18 to 24, 31.2% from 25 to 44, 18.8% from 45 to 64, and 11.0% who were 65 years of age or older.  The median age was 32 years. For every 100 females, there were 94.6 males.  For every 100 females aged 18 and over, there were 89.8 males.

The median income for a household in the city was $46,000 and the median income for a family was $50,017. Males had a median income of $35,991 versus $28,768 for females. The per capita income for the city was $18,197.  About 9.3% of families and 11.1% of the population were below the poverty line, including 14.4% of those under age 18 and 7.6% of those age 65 or over.

Crime
While reports of robberies, aggravated assaults, and petty thefts in Downey dropped in 2008, auto thefts reached a 10-year high. In 2008, 1,231 vehicles were reported stolen in Downey. Other crimes recorded by the FBI Crime Index for the year 2008 include 252 robberies, 172 aggravated assaults, 24 rapes, 711 burglaries, and 2,038 acts of larceny/thefts.

Anti-gang activities
In the late 1980s and early 1990s, Downey saw an increase in gang activity. Today there is still gang activity going in the south area of Downey.  In response, Downey formed GOOD (Gangs Out Of Downey), a community-based organization that helps encourage young people between the ages of 10–20 to stay away from gangs. GOOD is also responsible for organizing many community events and programs such as various sports, after-school care, scholarship programs for at-risk students looking to attend college, and counseling for both young people and their parents. GOOD has kept a close partnership with the Downey Police Department.

Economy

Most Business-Friendly Award 
In 2017, the City of Downey was recognized as L.A. County's "Most Business-Friendly City" by the Los Angeles County Economic Development Corporation for cities with a population greater than 68,000.

Largest employers

According to the city's 2021 Comprehensive Annual Financial Report, the top employers in the city are:

Government

Culture

The author Tom Wolfe wrote about Downey. His article "The Hair Boys" was about Harvey's Drive-in and the fashions that the hair boys wore. He claimed that Harvey's was one of the great unacknowledged centers of fashion in the world. The essay appears in his 1968 book "The Pump House Gang." His drawing of one of the hair boys appears in his book "In Our Time."

In 1955, Downey was featured in newspapers worldwide when truck driver George Di Peso lived at 7739 Alderdale Street and had a gopher problem. He tried to solve it by putting a hose down a gopher hole and turning on the water to drown it, but he couldn't get the hose out afterwards. He then noticed that the hose was slowly being pulled down the hole. Wire services found out about this, and the mysterious phenomenon was reported in newspapers worldwide. According to a July 3, 1955 front-page article in the Los Angeles Times ("Tokyo Awaits Arrival of Downey Hose"), "A message received from Tokyo at the United Press office here read 'Tell Di Peso in Downey the other end of his hose has not turned up here, but we're all still looking.'" There was a great deal of speculation about the cause of the disappearing hose. Eventually the hose vanished completely. The most likely explanation was that there was an underground river that pulled at the hose.

In the early 1960s, it was widely reported that the Downey City Library had banned Edgar Rice Burroughs' Tarzan books because Tarzan was not married to Jane when they conceived Boy. Evidence for the rumor's staying power is in articles in the Los Angeles Times that were published in the 1970s (for example, "Downey Sends L.A. Back to the Bush League," Jack Smith, May 8, 1970). The rumor about Tarzan was, however, a wild exaggeration. According to "Zane Grey Also Safe: Tarzan’s Marital Status No Issue as Downey School Ban Is Denied" (Los Angeles Times December 28, 1961), a rumor spread that one of Downey's elementary schools had removed Edgar Rice Burroughs and Zane Grey books from its library because "1—There was no indication that Tarzan and his mate, Jane, were ever married before they took up housekeeping in the treetops," and "2—Grey was known to put such expletives as 'damn!’ and 'hell' in the mouths of his western cowhands." It turns out that there was no "ban." What happened was that in one elementary school, a parent had put two Zane Grey books "out of site in a desk drawer." No Tarzan books were involved. The Zane Grey books were put back on the shelves.

Education

Primary and secondary schools

Most of Downey is within the Downey Unified School District.  Downey's two main public high schools are named for Governor John G. Downey and Governor and US Supreme Court Chief Justice Earl Warren.

Downey has three public high schools: Downey, Warren, and Columbus High School.  Other public schools include:

 Stauffer Middle School (formerly West Middle School)
 Doty Middle School (formerly East Middle School)
 Griffiths Middle School (formerly North Middle School) It was named after a revered principal, Gordon Griffiths.
 Sussman Middle School (formerly South Middle School)
 Alameda Elementary School
 Carpenter Elementary School
 Gallatin Elementary School
 Gauldin Elementary School
 Imperial Elementary School
 Lewis Elementary School
 Old River Elementary School
 Price Elementary School
 Rio Hondo Elementary School
 Rio San Gabriel Elementary School
 Unsworth Elementary School
 Ward Elementary School
 Williams Elementary School

Small sections are within the Montebello Unified School District.

Private schools include:
 Calvary Chapel Christian School: pre-K–12
 St. Pius X-Matthias Academy: 9–12
 Our Lady of Perpetual Help School: TK-K–8 
 Saint Raymond's Catholic School: pre-K–8
 Saint Mark's Episcopal School: pre-K–8

Public libraries
The Downey City Library serves the city. The first library in Downey was established in 1901 by a women's social club that was founded in 1898. The County of Los Angeles Public Library opened a branch in Downey in September 1915. The county branch moved several times; its final location was in the County Civic Center. In 1958 the Downey City Council voted to establish its own library and withdraw from the county system. The city library services were originally provided out of the back of a bookstore. The city library opened in the former cafeteria of the former Downey Elementary School, then being used as the city hall and police station, on July 1, 1958. A permanent library building was built on December 7, 1959. It had almost  and it was built for $186,200, costing $11.97 per square foot. It was dedicated on December 17 and opened on December 18. In February 1984 an addition of almost  was completed and dedicated.

In addition the headquarters of the County of Los Angeles Public Library are located in Downey.

Infrastructure

Health care
The Los Angeles County Department of Public Health operates the Whittier Health Center in Whittier, serving Downey.

Post office
The United States Postal Service operates the Downey Post Office at 8111 Firestone Boulevard, the North Downey Post Office at 10409 Lakewood Boulevard, and the South Downey Post Office at 7911 Imperial Highway.

Transportation
The city can be conveniently reached by any of four freeways: Interstate 105 with its Metro rail line passes through the southern part of the city, Interstate 5 passes through the northern part, Interstate 605 passes along the eastern side, and Interstate 710 passes just west of the city.

Los Angeles County Metropolitan Transportation Authority (Metro) provides bus services to the city, and is served by the Lakewood Boulevard station of the Green Line (Los Angeles Metro). The city also operates a local bus service called DowneyLINK.

Notable people

Dave Alvin, musician, founder of Downey-based rockabilly band The Blasters with brother Phil
Bob Bennett, contemporary Christian musician, singer-songwriter, recording artist, was born in Downey
Paul Bigsby, father of the modern electric solid-body guitar, built in 1948, and creator of the Bigsby vibrato
William Bonin, serial killer; was Downey resident during his crime spree
The Carpenters (singer-musicians Karen and Richard) moved to Downey in 1963, originally to an apartment complex called the Shoji on 12020 Downey Ave, later moving to a house that still stands on Newville Avenue which can be seen on the cover of their album, Now & Then; after the duo's success, they built two apartment buildings still located on 5th St.
Miranda Cosgrove, actress and singer, star of iCarly
Art Cruz, musician and songwriter, current drummer of Lamb of God
Rosario DeSimone (1873–1946), Downey-based crime boss
Walt Faulkner, Indy car driver, first rookie to win pole position at Indianapolis 500
Ed Fiori, professional golfer
Ty France, professional baseball player
Donavon Frankenreiter, surfer and musician
Kevin Gross, former Major League Baseball pitcher for Los Angeles Dodgers and Anaheim Angels
Dan Henderson, mixed martial artist
Demos Shakarian, businessman and founder of Full Gospel Business Men's Fellowship International
Brian Haner, Musician/Comedian 
James Hetfield, Metallica frontman
Leon Hooten, former baseball player for Oakland Athletics
Robert Illes, Emmy-winning TV writer and producer
Allison Iraheta, musician, American Idol Season 8 contestant
Kerry King, Slayer guitarist
Evan Longoria, an All-Star third baseman for the Tampa Bay Rays and the San Francisco Giants, was born in Downey
Darren McCaughan, professional baseball player for the Seattle Mariners, was raised in Downey.
Ira J. McDonald, Los Angeles City Council member, 1941–43, Downey civic leader
Ron McGovney, original Metallica bassist, spent school years in Downey
Bob Meusel, baseball star for New York Yankees who played with Babe Ruth and Lou Gehrig, lived and died in Downey
Riki R. Nelson, oil painter
Tom Nieto, professional baseball player
George Pajon, Jr., Grammy Award-winning recording and performing artist
Lena Park, South Korean singer
Wayne Rainey, former American Grand Prix motorcycle racer, was born in Downey
Kimmy Robertson, actress best known for her role as Lucy Moran in Twin Peaks
Rich Rodriguez, Major League Baseball pitcher 1990–2003
Paul Ruffner, pro basketball player
Kenneth Shelley, figure skater, U.S. champion and Olympian, was born in Downey
Dennis Sproul, NFL player
JoJo Starbuck, figure skater, U.S. champion and Olympian, grew up in Downey
 Aimee Teegarden, actress (Friday Night Lights) and fashion model
 Alanna Ubach, actress
 Joan Weston, queen of Roller Derby, grew up in Downey
 "Weird Al" Yankovic, musician and parody artist, was born in Downey
 Joslyn Davis, host of Clevver TV and YouTube personality, was raised in Downey.
 Andrew Robert Young, U.S. Ambassador to Burkina Faso (appointed 2016), was born in Downey.
 Stephanie Zavala, professional bowler, 2021 PWBA Rookie of the Year, resides in Downey.

Sister cities

Downey's sister cities are:

 Alajuela, Costa Rica
 Efrat, Israel

 Fresnillo, Mexico
 Guadalajara, Mexico
 San Quintín, Mexico
 Taghmaconnell, Ireland

Media
The Downey Patriot is a weekly community newspaper serving the Downey community. The Los Angeles Times and the Press-Telegram are the daily newspapers that provide daily local coverage in Los Angeles County and the Gateway Cities region.

References

External links

 
1956 establishments in California
Cities in Los Angeles County, California
Incorporated cities and towns in California
Gateway Cities
Irish-American neighborhoods
Chicano and Mexican neighborhoods in California